South Dakota Highway 26 (SD 26) is a  state highway in the central part of the U.S. state of South Dakota. It connects rural areas of Hyde, Hand, and Spink counties.

The highway was established around 1935, replacing SD 22. The segment between SD 45 and SD 47 was added to the path of SD 26 between 1957 and 1962.

An extension of this highway, from US 83 in Onida to SD 47 was proposed in the late 1970s. Although a road was built in this area, it was not designated as part of SD 26.

Route description

Hyde County
SD 26 begins at an intersection with SD 47 and the eastern terminus of County Road 645 (180th Street) at a point north of Highmore, in the north-central part of Hyde County. SD 26 takes 180th Street to the east. At an intersection with 344th Avenue, it enters the northwestern part of Hand County.

Hand County
Just west of 345th Avenue, SD 26 crosses over Lost Creek. West of 354th Avenue, it enters Polo. East of Polo Drive, it leaves the community. East of 357th Avenue, the highway crosses over Shaefer Creek. East of 359th Avenue, it intersects SD 45. At 181st Street, SD 26 splits off and resumes its eastward routing. Just west of 366th Avenue, it crosses over North Wolf Creek. Just west of 369th Avenue, it curves to the east-southeast. Between 370th and 371st avenues, it curves back to the east. At an intersection with CR 24 (374th Avenue), it enters the southwestern part of Spink County.

Spink County
Immediately, SD 26 crosses over Medicine Creek and curves to the north. South of 180th Street, the highway curves to the north-northwest and begins to parallel the western part of Cottonwood Lake. Just north of this intersection, it curves to the north-northeast and winds its way along the shore of the lake. At the northern edge of the lake, the highway curves to the east-northeast. Just east of 178th Street, it curves to the east and then to the north. Just south of CR 19 (377th Avenue), SD 26 curves to the east. East of 378th Avenue, it curves to the east-southeast and crosses over Turtle Creek. East of 384th Avenue, it curves to the east-northeast and reaches its eastern terminus, an intersection with U.S. Route 281 (US 281).

National Highway System
No part of SD 26 is included as part of the National Highway System, a system of routes determined to be the most important for the nation's economy, mobility and defense.

History

The original SD 26 was established in 1926 from SD 25 west of Bryant to SD 15 east of Estelline. This route was renumbered as SD 28 around 1935.
SD 26 was established around 1935. Its path replaced that of SD 22. The western part of the highway, between SD 45 and SD 47 was added to the path of SD 26 between 1957 and 1962.

In the late 1970s, the highway was planned to be extended from US 83 in Onida to SD 47. There is a road in this area, but it is an unnumbered path. The SD 26 designated was not placed on this roadway.

Major intersections

See also

References

External links

The Unofficial South Dakota Highways Page: Highways 1-30

0026
Transportation in Hyde County, South Dakota
Transportation in Hand County, South Dakota
Transportation in Spink County, South Dakota